Johann "Hans" Horvath (20 May 1903 – 30 July 1968) was an Austrian footballer. Normally a forward, Horvath was one of the most noted Austrian footballers of his generation, and was well–known for his passing ability and technique.

Club career
One of Austria's most prolific strikers of the 1920s, Hansi Horvath played for several club teams in Vienna. He spent most seasons with 1. Simmeringer SC but also played for Rapid Wien with whom he reached and lost the Mitropa Cup final in 1927 and again in 1928.

International career
He made his debut for Austria in a January 1924 friendly match against Germany in which he also scored his first international goal and was a participant at the 1934 FIFA World Cup where he scored 2 goals and the team claimed 4th place. He earned 46 caps, scoring 29 goals. His last international was an October 1934 friendly match against Hungary.

International goals
Austria's goal tally first

Honours
Austrian Football Bundesliga (2):
 1929, 1930
Austrian Cup (1):
 1929

External links
 Rapid stats - Rapid Archive

References

1903 births
1968 deaths
Austrian footballers
Austria international footballers
Austrian people of Hungarian descent
1934 FIFA World Cup players
1. Simmeringer SC players
SK Rapid Wien players
Footballers from Vienna
Association football forwards